Nanstelocephala is a genus of fungus in the family Crepidotaceae It was originally placed in Cortinariaceae. The genus is monotypic, containing the single species Nanstelocephala physalacrioides, found in the USA.

References

Crepidotaceae
Taxa described in 1990
Fungi of North America
Monotypic Agaricales genera
Taxa named by Ron Petersen
Taxa named by Franz Oberwinkler